This is a list of geographical features in the state of Lower Saxony, Germany.

Mountains 
 Harz
 Weserbergland

Rivers 
 Aller
 Bode
 Elbe
 Ems
 Fulda
 Hunte
 Innerste
 Leine
 Neetze
 Oker
 Oste
 Werra
 Weser

Lakes 
 Dümmer
 Steinhuder Meer
 Zwischenahner Meer

Islands 
 Borkum
 East Frisian Islands

Miscellaneous 
 East Frisia
 Emsland
 Frisia
 Harz National Park
 Hildesheim Börde
 Lower Saxony Wadden Sea National Park
 Lüneburg Heath
 Wadden Sea
 Wendland
 Teutoburg Forest

Cities 
List of cities in Lower Saxony by population

Lower Saxony-related lists
Lower Saxony